Émile Auguste Renault, better known by his pseudonym Malo-Renault, was a French pastelist, color engraver and illustrator. He was born in Saint-Malo on October 5, 1870 and died in Le Havre on July 19, 1938.

Biography 
Since childhood he started drawing frequently. Auguste Lemoine (1848-1909), a drawing teacher at the college of Saint-Malo from 1883 to 1903 inspired him to draw from nature and in colour. Under the direction of Auguste Lemoine, Malo-Renault experimented with etchings. After completing his Bachelor of Arts, Malo-Renault went on to study architecture in Paris as a Stéphane Pannemaker student at the École nationale supérieure des arts décoratifs.

It was only after his marriage in 1897 with Honorine Tian (1871-1953), known as Nori Malo-Renault, a student of etcher Géry-Bichard, that Malo-Renault began his engraving career with the support of his wife for the development of color prints, in particular in Le serpent noir by Paul Adam.

Between 1903 and 1928 he participated in many exhibitions at the Salon of the Société Nationale des Beaux-Arts, where he was a member from 1910. he is a representative of the art nouveau style with a Japanese influence.

Works 

Work

Malo-Renault finds his inspiration in his native land, Saint-Malo and Brittany: landscapes and Bretons are the first subjects of his pastels and his color prints.

He specialized in color engraving, first in etching, in soft varnish, then in drypoint. In 1912, he took up wood engraving on the advice of Stéphane Pannemaker, but it was mainly afterwards that he adopted the process of wood with a penknife for the illustration of La Rapsode foraine and Le Pardon de Sainte-Anne ( 1920) based on this poem by Tristan Corbière.

 

   .

On the occasion of the release in 1922 of Jardin de Bérénice by Maurice Barrès, he engraved on wood the print of the menu for the Cent bibliophiles, using four plates for the four colors.

Pastels 
    Pastels by Malo-Renault (early 20th century)

Color print

Works in public collections 

 London
 British Museum
 A little girl lying in bed, holding four dolls in her arms, drypoint printed in colour
 Two women sitting on chairs, facing opposite directions, drypoint printed in colour
 Genève
 Musée d'Art et d'Histoire
 Cinq Heures rue de la Paix
 Un Trottin
 Chez le pâtissier
 Paris :
 département des arts graphiques du musée du Louvre (ancienne Chalcographie) :
 Vue de Quimperlé;
 Saint-Malo;
 Villeneuve-lès-Avignon, 1925;
 Vue du Mont Saint-Michel;
 Petite Baigneuse;
 Sur le Sable, 39 × 26 cm
 Le Château de Combourg;
 département des estampes et de la photographie de la Bibliothèque nationale de France :
 La Fourrure blanche, vers 1907, pointe-sèche en couleur;
 Famille de Bigoudens, vers 1907, eau-forte en couleur;
 Le Cochon, illustration pour Le Rire du 20 avril 1907;
 19e Dîner du Moulin à Sel…, 1907, eau-forte;
 Sirène de Paris, 1908, eau-forte;
 frontispice pour l'annuaire 1897-1908 de L'Estampe nouvelle, eau-forte et pointe-sèche;
 La Petite fille aux poupées, 1911-1913, pointe-sèche en couleur;
 Un trottin, pointe-sèche en couleur;
 Le Thé chez Rumpelmayer, 1912, pointe-sèche en couleur;
 Ex-libris André Barrier, vers 1912, pointe-sèche;
 Tête de Bretonne, 1912,	projet d'ex-libris, bois;
 La  Lecture, vers 1912, pointe-sèche en couleur;
 L'Oreiller, 1912-1913, pointe-sèche en couleur;
 12 pointe-sèche pour Modes de Paris, 1912-1913;
 Mlle Jacqueline R., 1913, pointe-sèche en couleur;
 Dîner des Amis de l'eau-forte, 1913, pointe-sèche;
 Cinq heures rue de la Paix, 1913, pointe-sèche en couleur;
 Menu pour la Société des Cent Bibliophiles, eau-forte en couleur (1913). La Bretagne offrant le Serpent noir à cette Société.
 Sur le sable, vers 1913, eau-forte en couleur;
 Soins maternels, vers 1913-1914, pointe-sèche en couleur;
 Vue de Quimperlé, 1913-1919, eau-forte en couleur;
 La Rose jaune, 1914, pointe-sèche en couleur;
 Venezia delle Guerra, vers 1917, bois en couleur;
 La Douloureuse Passion de N.S. Jésus-Christ, par A.C. Emme, 1921, cinq planches;
 La Queste nocturne; L'Âme consumée; Divin dialogue, trois illustrations pour Saint Jean de la Croix. Les Canciones, 1920, bois;
 En route de Joris-Karl Huysmans, 1921, deux illustration, bois;
 Après le Match, 1921, pointe-sèche en couleur;
 La Vierge de la mer, vers 1921, bois;
 Chansons de France choisies et accompagnées d'images par Malo-Renault, 1923;
 Villeneuve-les-Avignon, 1925, eau-forte en couleur;
 Sonnets pour Hélène, de Ronsard, 1925, pointe-sèches en couleur;
 Menu pour la Société des Amis des Livres, 2 février 1926, pointe-sèche en couleur;
 La Tasse de thé, 1926, pointe-sèche en couleur;
 Vue du Mont-Saint-Michel, vers 1926, pointe-sèche en couleur;
 Le Château de Combourg, vers 1930;
 Deux Pommes (cabaret breton), pointe-sèche en couleur;
 Illustration pour le Bulletin de l’œuvre de Sainte Clotilde, vers 1930.

Illustrated books

Literature 

 Jules Renard, Ragotte, etchings in black and white printed intaglio by Geny Gros, 28 × 19 cm, Paris, bookstore of the Collection des Dix, A. Ramagnol editions, 1909, 117 p.
 Malo-Renault, Quelques-unes, album, suite engraved in color of 15 Parisienne sketches, preface by Roger Marx, 41 × 29 cm, 1909.
 Paul Adam, Le Serpent noir, more than 80 etchings and drypoints in color, Les Cent bibliophiles, 29 × 21 cm, 1913, 335 p.
 Tristan Corbière, La Rapsode foraine et Le pardon de Sainte-Anne, 12 woods enhanced with colors, 32 × 26 cm, Flory, 1920, 22 p.
 Maurice Barrès, Le Jardin de Bérénice, 30 dry-points in color, 28 × 20 cm, Les Cent bibliophiles, 1922, 170 p.
 Émile Malo-Renault, Raquettes, text and 6 dry-points in color, 39 × 28 cm, L’Estampe nouvelle, 1923. Edition of 45 signed copies.
 François-René de Chateaubriand, René, 6 dry-points in color and headbands, 28 × 19 cm, prints printed by Porcabeuf, Paris, Dorbon, 1925, 101 p.
 Charles Perrault, Peau d'âne, La Belle au bois dormant, drawings by Malo-Renault, Larousse, 1923.
 Émile Souvestre,Les mille et une nuits de la Bretagne, (Le foyer Breton), illustrations by Malo Renault, (1929)
 Honoré de Balzac, Ursule Mirouët, Paris, collection « L'Adolescence catholique », 1928.
 Jean des Cognets, D'un vieux Monde, Drawings of Malo-Renault, printed monograph, O.L. Aubert (1932) Saint-Brieuc.

Some illustrations 1904  to 1928

Youth literature

 Le Roi des Corsaires. Text and drawings by Malo-Renault (14 engravings), Paris, Larousse, 1919, << Les livres roses pour la jeunesse>>, n° 261 (200x130), 32 p
Charles Perrault, Peau d'âne, La Belle au bois dormant, dessins de Malo-Renault, Larousse, 1923.
 Chansons de France, reunited by Adolphe Gauwin, illustrations by Malo-Renault, Paris, 1923, 1925, 1926, 1928; Hachette, 1931; Hachette Jeunesse, 1993

Publications 

 « Un artiste breton Daniel Mordant », Le Fureteur Breton, April–May 1907, second year, n° 10, p. 167-168.
 « Le peintre Auguste Lemoine », Annales de Société d'histoire et d'archéologique de l'arrondissement de Saint-Malo, 1910, p. 259-270.
 « Charles Le Goffic ». Le Nouvelliste de Bretagne, December 12, 1910.
 « Le Monotype», Art et décoration, February 1920, p. 49-56, 8 engravings.
 « Henri Rivière », Art et décoration, February. 1921, p. 43-51, 10 engravings
 « Les Merveilles du Livre italien », A.B.C magazine de l'art, June 1926, p. 177-181.
 « Sergent-Marceau et Emira Marceau graveurs », L' Amateur d' estampes, 1927
« La technique d'Henri de Toulouse-Lautrec, graveur ». L'Amateur d'estampes, 6th year, no 3, May 1927, p. 83-87
« La gravure sur bois: gravure au canif, gravure au burin, gravure en camaïeu, gravure en couleur », Le Dessin, revue d'art, d' éducation et d'enseignement, October 1930, p. 369-372; et novembre 1930, p. 429-432.
« La gravure en taille-douce. Le pointillé, la manière noire ou mezzotint, la pointe sèche », Le Dessin, Avril 1931, n° 12, p. 744-749.
« La gravure en taille-douce (suite). L'eau-forte, l' aquatinte et le vernis mou) », Le Dessin, May 1931, p 46-52.

Annex

References 

Pastel artists
French etchers
French wood engravers
French engravers
French illustrators
1870 births
1938 deaths
Color engravers